Māngere (spelled Mangere before 1997) is a New Zealand parliamentary electorate, returning one member of parliament to the Representatives of New Zealand. The current MP for Māngere is William Sio, elected for the Labour Party. He has held this electorate since 2008.

Population centres
Through an amendment in the Electoral Act in 1965, the number of electorates in the South Island was fixed at 25, an increase of one since the 1962 electoral redistribution. It was accepted that through the more rapid population growth in the North Island, the number of its electorates would continue to increase, and to keep proportionality, three new electorates were allowed for in the 1967 electoral redistribution for the next election. In the North Island, five electorates were newly created (including Mangere) and one electorate was reconstituted while three electorates were abolished. In the South Island, three electorates were newly created and one electorate was reconstituted while three electorates were abolished. The overall effect of the required changes was highly disruptive to existing electorates, with all but three electorates having their boundaries altered.

Māngere is based around the South Auckland suburbs of Māngere, Māngere Bridge, Favona and Māngere East. It has existed as an electorate since 1969; its boundaries were extended ahead of the introduction of mixed-member proportional (MMP) voting in 1996, swallowing up a section of the former Papatoetoe electorate.

In the 2007 boundary redistribution, Papatoetoe and Middlemore were transferred to the  electorate. The 2013/14 redistribution did not change the boundaries further.

History
Māngere, and all of South Auckland, forms the safest part of the Labour Party's core vote. Even during landslide elections in the National Party's favour, such as in 1975 and 1990, no Labour candidate for Māngere was seriously troubled.

Māngere was first represented by Colin Moyle of the Labour Party in 1969. Moyle represented the electorate until his resignation in 1977 over what became known as the 'Moyle Affair', and a subsequent by-election was won by a young barrister named David Lange, who would become Prime Minister after Labour's 1984 election victory. Lange retired in 1996 and the nomination was handed to Taito Phillip Field, at the time the MP for Otara. Field was returned with a high share of the vote in subsequent elections, but following his expulsion from the Labour caucus in 2007, his former party nominated former Manukau City deputy mayor William Sio in his place, who won the seat with a majority of over 7,000 votes in the 2008 election.

Members of Parliament
Unless otherwise stated, all MPs terms began and started at general elections.

Key

List MPs
Members of Parliament elected from party lists in elections where that person also unsuccessfully contested the Māngere electorate. Unless otherwise stated, all MPs terms began and ended at general elections.

Election results

2020 election

2017 election

2014 election

2011 election

Electorate (as at 26 November 2011): 39,534

2008 election

Note: lines coloured beige denote the winner of the electorate vote. Lines coloured pink denote a candidate elected to Parliament from their party list.

2005 election

2002 election

1999 election

1996 election

1993 election

1990 election

1987 election

1984 election

1981 election

1978 election

1977 by-election

1975 election

1972 election

1969 election

Table footnotes

Notes

References

External links
Electorate Profile  Parliamentary Library

New Zealand electorates in the Auckland Region
1969 establishments in New Zealand